= Said Makapu =

Tanzanian footballer

Personal information
- Full name: Said Juma Ally Makapu
- Date of birth: 4 January 1996 (age 30)
- Height: 1.75 m (5 ft 9 in)
- Position: Midfielder

Team information
- Current team: Young Africans
- Number: 31

Senior career*
| Years | Team | Apps | (Gls) |
| 2013–2014 | Shangani | | |
| 2014–2015 | Mjini Magharibi | | |
| 2015– | Young Africans | | |

International career^{‡}
| 2014 | Tanzania | 2 | (0) |
- * Club domestic league appearances and goals as of 1 August 2020 ‡ National team caps and goals as of 1 August 2020

Said Makapu (born 4 January 1996) is a Tanzanian football midfielder who plays for Young Africans.
